The Atlanta Legends were a professional American football franchise based in Atlanta, Georgia, and one of the eight members of the Alliance of American Football (AAF), which played one season from February 2019 to April 2019. They played their home games at Georgia State Stadium on the campus of Georgia State University. The Legends were one of two AAF teams based in a city that already had an NFL team (the Atlanta Falcons; the other team was the Arizona Hotshots, where the NFL's Cardinals were based). The Legends were coached by Kevin Coyle, one of two AAF coaches without prior head coaching experience, after the position became available when Brad Childress resigned a month before the season began. Billy Devaney was the general manager.

On April 2, 2019, the league's football operations were reportedly suspended, and on April 4 the league allowed players to leave their contracts to sign with NFL teams. The league filed for Chapter 7 bankruptcy on April 17, 2019.

History
The Alliance Atlanta team was announced by the league on April 25, 2018, as its second initial team. Additionally, the head coach, Brad Childress, and offensive coordinator, Michael Vick, were announced. On September 20, the league announced for four eastern inaugural franchises' names and logos including Atlanta as the Atlanta Legends. The name and colors (purple, gold, white) are tributes to famous historical figures from the city, such as Martin Luther King Jr. and Hank Aaron.

Childress resigned a month before the start of the 2019 season, and Kevin Coyle, initially hired as the team's defensive coordinator, took Childress's place. On February 7, 2019, two days before their first game, head coach Coyle announced that Vick would be unable to fill his role as offensive coordinator and would instead act as an advisor to the team. Rich Bartel, who replaced Vick as de facto offensive coordinator and play-caller, abruptly resigned two days before the team's home opener, prompting the team to hire Ken Zampese to lead the offense.

The team's first game was at Spectrum Stadium against the Orlando Apollos on Saturday, February 9, 2019, where they lost 40–6. Their first home game was on February 24 against the Birmingham Iron, where they lost 28–12. After starting the season 0–3, the Legends recorded their first win against the Arizona Hotshots on March 3, 2019.

Final Roster

Allocation pool
The Legends' assigned area, which designated player rights, included the following:

Colleges
 Albany State
 Clark Atlanta
 Clemson
 Fort Valley State
 Georgia
 Georgia Southern
 Georgia State
 Georgia Tech
 Kennesaw State
 Louisville

 Mercer
 Morehouse
 North Carolina
 Savannah State
 Shorter
 Valdosta State
 Virginia
 Virginia Tech
 West Georgia

National Football League (NFL)
 Atlanta Falcons
 Carolina Panthers
 Jacksonville Jaguars
 Washington Redskins

Canadian Football League (CFL)
 Toronto Argonauts

Staff

Notable Players

Former Notable Players 
 Younghoe Koo - Current Atlanta Falcons Pro Bowl Kicker
 Aaron Murray - Former Georgia Bulldogs Quarterback
 Denard Robinson - Former Michigan Wolverines Running Back

2019 season

Final standings

Schedule

Preseason

Regular season
All times Eastern

 Changed from original time and/or network.

Game summaries

Week 1: at Orlando

Week 2: at San Diego

Week 3: Birmingham

Week 4: at Arizona

Week 5: Memphis

Week 6: San Antonio

Week 7: Orlando

Week 8: at Birmingham

Media
In addition to league-wide television coverage through NFL Network, CBS Sports Network, TNT, and B/R Live, Legends' games were also broadcast on local radio by WCNN ("680 The Fan").

References

Further reading
 

 
2018 establishments in Georgia (U.S. state)
2019 disestablishments in Georgia (U.S. state)